is a Japanese judoka.

Judo career
Funakubo started Judo at the age of 6.
In April 2011, she went on to Fujigakuen Junior High School where she was under the instruction of Yuta Yazaki and his wife Noriko Yazaki. Yuta is a former Asian Games champion, in addition, a Newaza specialist. Noriko is a former national champion.they both participated at the 2003 World Judo Championships.
In August 2013, she won all bouts for Ippon at the National Junior High School Championships.

In April 2014, she went on to Fujigakuen High School.
She won the Inter-High School Championships and the All-Japan Junior Championships 2 times in a row respectively in 2015, 2016.
In October 2015, she won the World Judo Championships Juniors both individual (–57 kg weight class) and team event. She won 5 out of 8 bouts with Funakubo-Gatame for Ippon.

In 2017, she became a member of the Judo club at the Mitsui Sumitomo Insurance Group.
In February 2017, she won all bouts with Funakubo-Gatame for Ippon at the European Open Sofia.

In April 2017, she became vice champion at the All-Japan weight championships. 
In October 2017, she retained the world junior title as well as the team title.

In September 2018, she won the Asian Games team event.
In October 2018, she won the world junior title as well as the team title three times in a row.

In April 2021, she won the All-Japan Selected Judo Championships.
In June 2021, she won the 2021 World Judo Championships – Mixed team.
In october 2021, she won the 2021 Judo Grand Slam Paris.

In february 2022, she won the 2022 Judo Grand Slam Paris.
In April 2022, she won the All-Japan Selected Judo Championships.

Funakubo-Gatame
Funakuo's favorite technique is Newaza, especially Osaekomi-waza called Funakubo-Gatame. 
Funakubo-Gatame is considered a modified Hara-Zutsumi (stomach wrap grabbing) technique. Hara-Zutsumi originates from Nanatei Judo 
This is officially classified as Kuzure-Kesa-Gatame or Kata-Gatame. 
When she was in the second grade at junior high school, she couldn't practice Judo because of a knee injury. Thus she was doing 1000 Pull‐ups every day for a month.
After the recovery, she invented Funakubo-Gatame to turn over an opponent in a prone position.

Some in the media say Funakubo looks like the actress Rena Nōnen.

References

External links
 
 
 
 Funakubo-Gatame Judo Newaza 舟久保遥香 舟久保固め 柔道 | Youtube
 Funakubo -Gatame Variations 色々な舟久保固め Judo | Youtube
 Funakubo Haruka's Newaza Technique Judo 舟久保遥香 柔道 | Youtube

1998 births
Living people
Japanese female judoka
Sportspeople from Yamanashi Prefecture
Judoka at the 2018 Asian Games
Asian Games gold medalists for Japan
Asian Games medalists in judo
Medalists at the 2018 Asian Games